Laudato Si' Movement (LSM) is a global network of over 900 Catholic organizations and over 10,000 trained grassroots leaders known as Laudato Si' Animators. Inspired by the Laudato Si' encyclical of Pope Francis, LSM's stated mission is to "inspire and mobilize the Catholic community to care for our common home and achieve climate and ecological justice".

History
Sponsored by Cardinal Luis Antonio Tagle, the movement was founded in the Philippines in January 2015, when Pope Francis arrived in Manila. Its original name, Global Catholic Climate Movement, was changed to Laudato Si' Movement in 2021 to better reflect its mission.

LSM has played a key role in supporting the church to receive and implement the Laudato si' encyclical. In partnership with the Vatican Dicastery for Integral Human Development, Laudato Si' Movement convenes various global initiatives to raise awareness and spark Catholic environmental action, such as:

the annual Laudato Si' Week celebration, held most recently in May 2022.
the Season of Creation ecumenical celebration, and    
the film "The Letter: A Message for our Earth".

LSM has also spearheaded other initiatives such as the Laudato Si' Animators training, and record-breaking participation of Catholic institutions in the Fossil fuel divestment campaign.

References

External links
 Laudato Si' Movement official website
 The Letter film
 Laudato Si' Week
 Season of Creation

Organizations established in 2015
International associations of the faithful
Catholic charities
Charities based in Italy
Environmental organizations